The Right Reverend Livingstone Asong Komla Buama is a former Moderator of the General Assembly of the Evangelical Presbyterian Church, Ghana (E.P. Church).

Buama hails from Klefe in the Volta Region of Ghana.

He became moderator in January 2001 after serving for over 25 years in the church. Prior to this, he had been lecturing at the Trinity College and Seminary at Legon in Ghana.

Livingstone Buama was runner up in elections as Volta Region's representative on the Council of State of Ghana in February 2009.

See also
Evangelical Presbyterian Church, Ghana

References 

Living people
Ghanaian clergy
Ghanaian Presbyterians
Ghanaian theologians
Ghanaian religious leaders
People from Volta Region
Ewe people
Year of birth missing (living people)
Trinity Theological Seminary, Legon alumni
Academic staff of Trinity Theological Seminary, Legon